Hi Hi Hi may refer to:

"Hi, Hi, Hi", song by Paul McCartney
"Hi! Hi! Hi!", song by German singer Sandra
"Hi Hi Hi", by the Japanese band Scandal from Temptation Box 2010
Hi Hi Hi, Japanese manga by Shohei Harumoto

See also
 Hihi (disambiguation)